Neocollyris siniaevi is a species of ground beetle in the genus Neocollyris in the family Carabidae. It was described by Naviaux in 2004.

References

Siniaevi, Neocollyris
Beetles described in 2004